The 50th Golden Horse Awards (Mandarin:第50屆金馬獎) took place on November 23, 2013 at Sun Yat-sen Memorial Hall in Taipei, Taiwan.

References

50th
2013 film awards
2013 in Taiwan